Jessica "Jessie" Lynn Warren (born December 12, 1995) is an American, former collegiate All-American, professional softball player. She played college softball for the Florida State Seminoles, winning the 2018 Women's College World Series national title as a senior, and was subsequently named Most Outstanding Player for the series. 

Warren is the Atlantic Coast Conference career leader in RBIs, home runs, slugging percentage and total bases, ranking top-10 in all except slugging for the NCAA Division I. She was drafted #7 in the National Pro Fastpitch and went on to play for the USSSA Pride. She played in the inaugural season of Athletes Unlimited Softball league, where she was the runner-up for second most individual points.

Career
Warren attended Braulio Alonso High School in Hillsborough County, Florida. She later attended Florida State University, where she was an All-American college softball player on the Florida State Seminoles softball team. Warren led the Seminoles to the 2018 Women's College World Series title, where she was named the 2018 Women's College World Series Most Outstanding Player.

Warren joined the USSSA Pride of National Pro Fastpitch (NPF), a professional softball league, in 2019. In August 2019, she became the fourth NPF recipient of the Rawlings Gold Glove Award.

Statistics

References

External links
 
Florida State bio
USSSA Pride bio

1995 births
American softball players
Living people
Softball players from Florida
Florida State Seminoles softball players
Florida State University alumni
Sportspeople from Tampa, Florida
USSSA Pride players
Women's College World Series Most Outstanding Player Award winners